Oscar Alcides Mena Fernández (born 30 November 1970), nicknamed El Mencho, is an Argentine retired footballer who played as a defensive midfielder, and is a manager.

Playing career
Born in Luján, Buenos Aires, Mena started his career playing for Club Luján and then Club Defensores de Cambaceres, both in the third division. In 1994, he made his debut in the Primera División with Club Atlético Platense, moving to Club Atlético Lanús for a further season.

In 1997–98, both Mena and goalkeeper Carlos Roa were bought by Spain's RCD Mallorca. Eminently a defensive-minded player, the former scored seven La Liga goals during the campaign, helping the Balearic Islands team finish fifth straight from the second level as well as to a runner-up finish in the Copa del Rey.

Subsequently, Mena signed with Atlético Madrid, where he faced stiff competition for a starting job and also suffered from injuries. He resumed his career in Spain in its second, third and fourth tiers, with a quick return to Argentina with Olimpo de Bahía Blanca in between.

Coaching career
Mena retired from the game in February 2005, making a return to Atlético Madrid later on, appearing for its indoor soccer side. Subsequently, he began his coaching career, first with the Colchoneros' youths then acting as assistant to the C-team.

On 10 February 2014, following a division three loss at CD Sariñena which left Atlético Madrid B in the relegation zone, Mena replaced Alfredo Santaelena, who had also played for the club in the 90s, as head coach.

References

External links
Argentine League statistics 

1970 births
Living people
Argentine people of Spanish descent
Argentine footballers
Association football midfielders
Argentine Primera División players
Defensores de Cambaceres footballers
Club Atlético Platense footballers
Club Atlético Lanús footballers
Olimpo footballers
La Liga players
Segunda División players
Segunda División B players
RCD Mallorca players
Atlético Madrid footballers
Racing de Santander players
CD Toledo players
UD Las Palmas players
Argentine expatriate footballers
Expatriate footballers in Spain
Argentine expatriate sportspeople in Spain
Argentine football managers
Segunda División B managers
Atlético Madrid B managers
Argentine expatriate football managers
Expatriate football managers in Spain
People from Luján, Buenos Aires
Sportspeople from Buenos Aires Province